The  Writivism Short Story Prize and Koffi Addo Prize for Creative Nonfiction  are a pair of annual literary awards for work by emerging writers living in Africa. The Writivism Short Story Prize, for short fiction, was established in 2013. The Koffi Addo Prize for Creative Nonfiction was established in 2016. 

In 2016 the Koffi Addo Writivism Prize for Creative Nonfiction was established, organised by the Center for African Cultural Excellence (CACE). In its first year the Koffi Addo Prize was only open to Ghanaians, but in subsequent years it was open to any writer from the African continent.

Winners of the Writivism Short Story Prize

Winners of the  Koffi Addo Prize for Creative Nonfiction

External links
 Writivism: Prizes

References

African literary awards
Awards established in 2013
Short story awards
Non-fiction literary awards
Awards established in 2016